Gómez is a given name which may refer to:

People:
Gómez González (disambiguation)
Gómez Manrique (c. 1412–c. 1490), Spanish poet, soldier, politician and dramatist
Gómez Núñez (fl. 1071–1141), Galician and Portuguese political and military leader in the Kingdom of León
Gómez Pereira (1500–1567), Spanish philosopher, doctor and natural humanist
Gómez Pérez Dasmariñas (1519–1593), Spanish politician, diplomat, military officer and seventh Governor and Captain-General of the Philippines
Gómez Suárez de Figueroa (disambiguation)

Fictional characters:
Gomez Addams, patriarch of the Addams family of cartoons, a TV series, films and plays